Éric Mura (born 23 January 1963 in Saint-Cyr-l'École) is a French former professional football defender.

Mura was on the bench at the 1991 European Cup Final.

External links
 
 Profile
 Profile

1963 births
Living people
People from Saint-Cyr-l'École
Footballers from Yvelines
Association football defenders
French footballers
Olympique de Marseille players
RC Strasbourg Alsace players
SC Bastia players
LB Châteauroux players
Olympique Alès players
Olympique Noisy-le-Sec players
Pays d'Aix FC players
Ligue 1 players
Ligue 2 players